Halliste is a small borough in Mulgi Parish, Viljandi County, in southern Estonia, located about 6 km northeast of the town of Abja-Paluoja. Until 2017, Halliste was the administrative centre of Halliste Parish. As of 2011 Census, the settlement's population was 329.

The Halliste Holy Anna Church and Halliste Primary School are located on the territory of the neighbouring Pornuse village, and Halliste cemetery in Kulla village. The Halliste River flows about 3 km south of Halliste.

Gallery

References

External links
 Halliste Parish 

Boroughs and small boroughs in Estonia
Kreis Pernau